Francesco Sondelli (born 8 December 1973) is an Italian rock musician. He is the founder, guitarist and vocalist for alternative rock band The Petalstones. The band comprised Malin Åkerman, Swedish–Canadian actress, model and singer, on lead vocals, Mario Pagliarulo on bass and Roberto Zincone on drums

He is the founder and chief designer of music instrument company F-Pedals™.
He is also the founder of international music cultural project RocKramer, which is world tour of the multi-sensorial lecture and concert show featuring recording producer and engineer Eddie Kramer, who has worked with several artists in the Rock and Roll Hall of Fame, including The Beatles, David Bowie, Eric Clapton, Jimi Hendrix, The Kinks, Led Zeppelin, The Rolling Stones and Carlos Santana.
In 2013, Sondelli composed and directed the official anthem for S.S.C. Napoli, a professional Italian football club based in Naples and founded in 1926.

Early life 
Sondelli was born in Naples. He is a self-taught musician; he started playing piano and guitar at the age of ten. At age fifteen, he had written and composed a wide repertory of songs and performed concerts.

Music career 
In 1997 Sondelli started his first band Chao-Shi in Naples with bassist Mario Pagliarulo, who later became the bassist of Serj Tankian's touring band the Flying Cunts of Chaos, drummer Roberto Zincone, and guitarist Elio De Stefanis. The band earned a listing in the Enciclopedia del Poprock Napoletano and won the MTV Axe for Music Awards in 1998.
Sondelli, together with his bandmates Pagliarulo and Zincone, moved to Los Angeles in 2001 and renamed the band as Ozono. In 2003, Sondelli invited Malin Åkerman to become the co-lead singer of the band after they worked together on some new songs. With the addition of the new member, the band changed its name to The Petalstones. The band released its debut album, Stung, in August 2005. The band was dismissed in 2007.
After dismissal of the band, Sondelli started his solo music career and released his first solo CD "Disordinary" in 2007. The album was aided by Eddie Kramer, who sought Sondelli out after seeing him performing in Los Angeles in 2006. Sondelli was the finalist for the world's largest festival for unsigned bands Emergenza in Los Angeles 2007.
Besides being a performing artist, Sondelli has also written and produced songs for well-known international artists including Italian artist Belen Thomas, Sal Da Vinci, multi-Grammy's Mexican band Camila, Reyili, Ex MDO, Daniel Rene, Guatemalan singer Shery, Mexican TV star and artist Eiza González, G6 La Academia, Kristy Frank, and many more. He has worked with Grammy winning producers and engineers including Jay Baumgardner.

Sondelli was the music composer for song Déjame Ser in Puerto Rican artist Ednita Nazario's album Soy, which was ranked No. 1 US Billboard Top Latin Albums, Billboard Latin Pop Albums, and Puerto Rico Top Albums, and was nominated for Latin Pop Album of the Year in 2010.

In 2013, Sondelli was appointed by Aurelio De Laurentiis as the composer and music director of the official anthem of S.S.C.Napoli. He used the chorus of famous traditional Neapolitan song 'O surdato 'nnammurato and added new composition and arrangements to the song to make the new official anthem for the soccer club.

Additional projects and contributions

Project ReEvolution 
In Summer 2009, Sondelli started Project ReEvolution with Maurizio Capone, leader of BungtBangt from Naples, Italy, a band known as the "Eco Band" as they use music instruments exclusively made with recycled waste materials.  The project started with the collaborative composition of song Project ReEvolution by Sondelli and Capone, who worked together on the song through online video sessions without meeting each other in person for two months. The two artists finally came together in July 2009 to record the final version of the song and shoot the video in Naples. All the profits made by the sales of the song was donated to Mani Tese, a nonprofit organisation that supports sustainable development projects in different parts of the world, to finance two projects sponsored by Mani Tese: Project 2194 in Guatemala, whose objective is to promote the education of street children, and Project Sani Stella, which provides academic support to and sponsors creative workshops for children in the high risk neighbourhoods of La Sanità and Stella.

F-Pedals 
In 2011 Sondelli teamed up with engineer Eddie Kramer who become an F-Pedals partner, and In 2012 Sondelli founded F-Pedals, a company that designs and manufactures professional guitar pedals. After then he developed the first 2 models of The Legend Series, the Eddie Kramer signature Edstortion and Phazevibe, officially introduced to the market in 2013 after 2 years of relentless development. F-Pedals is the first company that introduced wireless power system for guitar effect pedals. in 2014 F-Pedals also introduced the patented revolutionary F-Power™, a wireless power system based on Nikola Tesla's electromagnetic induction of electricity studies and research.

In 2016 the line of pedals expanded with the introduction of a new series named Pulse of Rebellion that includes RobotHolic, DarkLight, EchoBandit Gold, EchoBandit Silver, Yurei, Lorion, Matterix.

RocKramer 
In March 2013, Sondelli founded project RocKramer, a worldwide tour of a multi-sensory show featuring lectures, story telling and photo archive sharing by recording producer and engineer Eddie Kramer, to share the stories of musicians from the 1960s and 1970s, and to inspire younger generations to approach music, arts and life with a creative spirit. The first event was held on 27 March 2013 in Teatro Trianon in Naples, Italy. The event was hosted by Sondelli and featured local celebrity bands including Capone Bungt Bangt, Osanna, James Senese, Antonio Onorato, Daniele Sepe, Gianni Guarracino, Brunella Selo, Radikal Kitsch, Moby Dick, Hendrix Boulevard, Francesco Forni and Sud Express.

References 

1973 births
Living people
Musicians from Naples
Italian male singer-songwriters
Italian record producers
21st-century Italian  male singers